The 2007 Clásica del Oeste-Doble Bragado was a men's road cycling race held from 5  to 11 February 2007 in Argentina. It was a multiple stage race over seven stages with a total length of 1146 kilometres.

Stage Summary

General Classification

References
 Dewielersite report

2007 in road cycling
International cycle races hosted by Argentina
Clasica
February 2007  sports events